The Rockaway Park–Beach 116th Street station is the western terminal station  on the IND Rockaway Line of the New York City Subway, located on Beach 116th Street near Rockaway Beach Boulevard in Rockaway Beach, Queens. It is served by the Rockaway Park Shuttle at all times and ten daily rush-hour A trains in the peak direction.

History

The station was originally built in 1882 as a Long Island Rail Road station on the Rockaway Beach Branch, was called Rockaway Beach, and contained a trolley stop for the Ocean Electric Railway, which eventually expanded their line further west to Belle Harbor and Neponsit. In 1899, the station was enlarged in order to accommodate the Brooklyn Rapid Transit Company cars, and the name was changed to Rockaway Park.

In spring 1917, a second station was built as a replacement for the former station, which was razed. After a 1950 fire at The Raunt destroyed the trestle across Jamaica Bay, the LIRR rerouted Rockaway Beach service along the Far Rockaway Branch, then abandoned the Rockaway Beach Branch. The New York City Board of Transportation purchased all stations on the branch in June 1952, and the New York City Transit Authority (successor to the Board of Transportation) closed them to LIRR service on October 3, 1955 in order to convert many of them into subway stations. The current station, Rockaway Park–Beach 116th Street, opened on June 28, 1956, with all other stations on the Rockaway Line except Far Rockaway. Far Rockaway reopened in 1958 after being rebuilt for Subway use, and the LIRR opened a new Far Rockaway station on Nameoke Street. Plans to add a subway line to the Rockaway Peninsula actually date back to the 1920s and originally involved extending the western terminus along Newport Avenue to Beach 149th Street, rather than its current terminus at Rockaway Park.

In 2002, it was announced that Rockaway Park would be one of ten subway stations citywide to receive renovations. Starting in May 2007, the station building, platform and yard area underwent renovation. The new station building was unveiled in early November 2007.

Station layout

The station is at ground level. There are two tracks and an island platform. The tracks end at bumper blocks at the west (railroad south) end of the platform.

On either side of the station are tracks leading to the Rockaway Park Yard. Originally, terminal tracks with low-level platforms occupied the yard area during the LIRR years. The area of the current high-level platform was part of the LIRR depot yard.

Exit
Because the entrance is at street level, the station is ADA accessible without the use of an elevator or ramps. The station house is made of concrete with windows and plywood walls and a brick exterior. It also has an entrance leading to an adjacent restaurant. An examination of the station house shows the former ticket windows, which were used when the line was part of the LIRR. The station houses Transit Police District 23, which was moved to the station in June 1977. A new police facility was opened on September 18, 2009. A NYCDOT municipal parking lot lies just north of the station.

Gallery

References

External links

 
 Station Reporter — Rockaway Park Shuttle
 Rockaway Park Station History (Arrt's Arrchives)
 The Subway Nut — Rockaway Park–Beach 116th Street Pictures
 MTA's Arts For Transit — Rockaway Park–Beach 116th Street (IND Rockaway Line)
 Beach 116th Street entrance from Google Maps Street View
 Platform from Google Maps Street View

IND Rockaway Line stations
Rockaway, Queens
New York City Subway stations in Queens, New York
New York City Subway terminals
Railway stations in the United States opened in 1956
1956 establishments in New York City